Hasora schoenherr, commonly known as the yellow banded awl, is a butterfly belonging to the family Hesperiidae which is found in India and Southeast Asia.

Range
The yellow banded awl is found in India from Assam and Nagaland eastwards to Southeast Asia, namely, Thailand, Laos, Vietnam, the Malay Peninsula, Singapore and the Indonesian archipelago (specifically recorded at Borneo, Sumatra and Palawan). The type locality is Java.

Description

The butterfly is a plain dark brown above and resembles the common banded awl (Hasora chromus), except that it has a broad yellow central band on the upper and under of the hindwings. The apex of the under forewing is purple washed. Both sexes have large yellow discal and apical spots.

References

Further reading

Brower, Andrew V. Z., (2007). Hasora Moore 1881. Version 21 February 2007 (under construction). Page on genus Hasora in The Tree of Life Web Project http://tolweb.org/.

Hasora
Butterflies of Asia
Butterflies described in 1824
Butterflies of Singapore